The Lymington River drains part of the New Forest in Hampshire in southern England. Numerous headwaters to the west of Lyndhurst give rise to the river, including Highland Water, Bratley Water and Fletchers Water. From Brockenhurst the river runs southwards to the Solent at Lymington.

History
In 1731 a merchant navy captain, Captain Cross, constructed a causeway and bridge across the estuary to the north of Lymington. He built toll houses and charged travellers using his causeway, more than a mile south of the existing bridge at Boldre. This impedes the river and further silted up Lymington harbour, losing its minor shipping rapidly. Lymington Corporation pursued the matter in court and lost their case. 

In 1795 the mud building up in the estuary "has rendered it already very narrow; and will probably in a few years, so completely choke it up, as to make it unnavigable by any ships of considerable burden." 

The causeway was taken over by the regional rail firm who collected the tolls until, after nationalised rail, it was bought out by Hampshire County Council in 1955 – tolls paid down the price and ceased a few years later. Today silting in the harbour as a result of the structure (almost a dam) occurs, but is ameliorated a higher sea level and the scouring effects of the Isle of Wight ferries. Before the structure it is said the diurnal tide influenced flow up to Brockenhurst.

Against the sea, the outer limit of the end of the estuary's mud at low tide is 550–650 metres closer to land than in 1895.

Reedbeds
The river's extensive reedbeds are a Site of Special Scientific Interest.

Water quality
The Environment Agency measure water quality of the river systems in England. Each is given an overall ecological status, which may be one of five levels: high, good, moderate, poor and bad. There are several components that are used to determine this, including biological status, which looks at the quantity and varieties of invertebrates, angiosperms and fish. Chemical status, which compares the concentrations of various chemicals against known safe concentrations, is rated good or fail.

Water quality of the Lymington River in 2019:

See also 

 Lymington and Keyhaven Marshes
 Hurst Castle and Lymington River Estuary

References

External links

Lymington
Rivers of Hampshire
Sites of Special Scientific Interest in Hampshire